Dan Pontefract is a Canadian businessperson and writer.

Early life and education
Pontefract is from Stoney Creek, Ontario. He earned a Bachelor of Education (BEd) in 1994 and a degree in Educational Technology in 1995 from McGill University. He received an MBA from Royal Roads University in 2002.

Career
Pontefract held senior roles at the British Columbia Institute of Technology (BCIT), BusinessObjects, and SAP SE. He then served as the Chief Envisioner and Chief Learning Officer at the Canadian national telecommunications company Telus. There he launched the Telus Transformation Office to improve workplace culture and the Telus MBA, "a customized executive MBA tailored for promising employees" at University of Victoria's Peter B. Gustavson School of Business. Pontefract also serves as an adjunct professor at the business school.

In 2018, Pontefract was named to the Thinkers50 Radar list of the "30 management thinkers most likely to shape the future of how organizations are managed and led."

Personal life
Pontefract is married to Denise Lamarche, a fellow alumnus of McGill.
Pontefract has 3 children.

Publications
Pontefract is the author of four business books. His 2018 book, Open to Think, won the 2019 Axiom Business Book Award silver medal in the leadership category. Open to Think won the 2019 getAbstract International Book Award.

 Lead. Care. Win.: How to Become a Leader Who Matters. Figure 1. September 2020. .

References

Year of birth missing (living people)
Businesspeople from Ontario
Canadian business writers
McGill University alumni
Royal Roads University alumni
Academic staff of the University of Victoria
Writers from Hamilton, Ontario
Living people